Feucht-Moosbach station is a railway station in the Moosbach district of the municipality of Feucht, located in the Nürnberger Land district in Middle Franconia, Germany. The station is on the Feucht–Altdorf line of Deutsche Bahn.

Haltepunkt Hahnhof
The Haltepunkt Hahnhof was in operation until 27 November 1987. It was abandoned in the course of the reconstruction of the line to an S-Bahn line and replaced by the Haltepunkt Feucht-Moosbach, which is located only a few hundred meters west of it, away, but therefore much cheaper for the development of the village. The Hahnhof facilities were dismantled after the closure.

References

Nuremberg S-Bahn stations
Railway stations in Bavaria
Railway stations in Germany opened in 1987
1987 establishments in West Germany
Buildings and structures in Nürnberger Land